IP Fabrics is a privately owned, US company that designs and manufactures network surveillance products for national security, lawful interception, data retention, and cyber crime applications.  Headquartered in Beaverton, Oregon, U.S., IP Fabrics employs between 10 and 20 employees and has over 50 customers.

History
IP Fabrics was founded in Beaverton, Oregon in 2002 by nine former RadiSys employees, including the founder, Glen Myers.  The first investors were employees and private investors, who contributed roughly $400K to fund the company’s operations until the first round of venture funding in August, 2003.  Financing was led by Ignition Partners of Bellevue, Washington; Frazier Technology Venture and northwest Venture Associates, both of Seattle; and Intel Capital.   Subsequent funding rounds came from the founders and members of the original venture investment team.  In 2008, the company’s assets were sold to a German company, ATIS UHER, who remains the largest shareholder.

Products
IP Fabrics has two main products: DeepProbe and DeepSweep, both network surveillance systems capable of monitoring one gigabit and ten gigabit Ethernet networks.  These are typically used in surveillance applications such as:

 IPDR generation for Data retention
 IP lawful intercept such as Title III and pen register for criminal investigations
 IP monitoring for intelligence gathering and other national security operations
 IP monitoring and intercept for detection and investigation of cyber crimes (online theft, Internet crimes against children, etc.)
 IP intercept and monitoring for insider threat detection, compliance, and forensic analysis of private networks

DeepProbe is an intelligent passive full decoding probe, often used in distributed surveillance environments, which are typically large, complex networks, or networks requiring significant application-level monitoring.   Examples of such networks would be nationwide surveillance solutions with probes installed at the key service providers and gateways, critical, secure government networks, or large communications service providers.  DeepProbe functions as a passive monitoring system, generally under the control of a separate surveillance element such as a mediation system or a Security Information and Event Management system.

DeepSweep is standalone surveillance system incorporating three common IP intercept functions:  intercept access point, mediation, and delivery functions.  DeepSweep is primarily used by US-based Internet Service Providers and Voice over IP providers to comply with the FCC’s broadband Communications Assistance for Law Enforcement Act requirement, as well as by North American law enforcement agencies as an Internet tactical wiretap system.

IP Fabrics has key technology in the areas of deep packet inspection, deep application protocol inspection, and high-speed parallel packet processing implemented on multicore processors.

See also
 List of companies based in Oregon

References

External links 

 Official website

Electronics companies of the United States
Companies based in Beaverton, Oregon
Companies established in 2002
Privately held companies based in Oregon
2002 establishments in Oregon